Phyllocnistis hagnopa is a moth of the family Gracillariidae, known from Tamil Nadu, India. The hostplant for the species is Ailanthus excelsa.

References

Phyllocnistis
Endemic fauna of India
Moths of Asia